Interstate 691 (I-691) is an auxiliary Interstate Highway in Connecticut beginning at I-91 in Meriden and ending at I-84 near the Cheshire–Southington town line.

I-691 is also known as the Henry D. Altobello Highway for its entire length.

Route description
I-691 is the main east–west highway of the city of Meriden. The freeway actually begins in Middlefield as Route 66, technically becoming I-691 at the junction with I-91 (exit 11). To go from I-91 northbound to I-691 westbound (or from I-691 eastbound to I-91 southbound), one must actually use Route 15. Exit 9 westbound provides access to Route 15 north.

West of the I-91/Route 15 interchange, I-691 meets US Route 5 (US 5), which provides access to Route 15 north for eastbound traffic. Exit 7 provides access to downtown Meriden. Westbound traffic exits onto State Street Extension, while eastbound traffic enters onto Columbia Street. Exits 6 and 5 provide access to Route 71, as well as access to Meriden Mall. Exit 6 exits to Lewis Avenue, while exit 5 exits directly to Route 71. From here, I-691 passes along the north side of Hubbard Park as well as by Castle Craig before it crosses into Southington. It then meets the eastern end of Route 322 at exit 4. It then crosses the Quinnipiac River into Cheshire, where it has an interchange with Route 10, then continues west to end at I-84 at the Southington–Cheshire town line. The highway officially ends as it merges into I-84 west.

History

In the 1940s, the I-691 routing was part of a planned US 6A expressway from Southington to Willimantic. A section of the expressway (from its Middlefield terminus west to exit 8) first opened in 1966. By 1968, the US 6A designation was dropped in favor of Route 66. The highway was extended west to exit 4 by 1971. The connection to I-84 was eventually completed in 1987, with the renumbering to I-691 done at the same time. The portion east of I-91 remained as Route 66. Environmental and community groups successfully blocked attempts to extend the freeway east of its present terminus due to potential impacts on the Mt. Higby Reservoir, which provides drinking water for the local area. A compromise was reached in the late 1990s allowing CTDOT to convert Route 66 from a two-lane road to four lanes from the eastern end of the I-691 freeway to the business district in Middletown. Construction on the Route 66 widening project was completed in 2005.

Exit list
Exits are currently sequential but are planned to be converted to mileage-based exit numbering in 2023.

References

External links

kurumi.com - I-691
virtualhighways.com - I-691

91-6
91-6
6
Transportation in Hartford County, Connecticut
Transportation in New Haven County, Connecticut
Transportation in Middlesex County, Connecticut
1988 establishments in Connecticut